Starhead Comix was an  alternative/underground comics publisher that operated from 1984–c. 1999. Founded by Michael Dowers, Starhead was based in Seattle, Washington. Mostly known for limited-edition minicomics, Starhead also published standard-sized, black-and-white comics in the early 1990s.

Creators associated with Starhead included Dennis Eichhorn, Ellen Forney, Roberta Gregory, David Lasky, Pat Moriarity, Art Penn, Ed "Big Daddy" Roth, J. R. Williams, Steve Willis, and Dennis Worden.

History 
Self-described "hippie" Michael Dowers discovered minicomics in 1982 and was immediately enthralled by the form. He began writing, drawing, printing, copying, and distributing his own mini comics (under the name Nessie Productions), and by 1984 formed Starhead Comix to publish his work and that of fellow cartoonists, including Ronald Roach, Steve Willis and J. R. Williams.

In the late 1980s, Starhead experimented with standard format comics, and from 1991–1995 the company focused almost exclusively on this form, often publishing  Pacific Northwest-based creators like Dennis P. Eichhorn, Forney, Gregory, Lasky, Colin Upton, and J. R. Williams.

The company's last few years were limited to publishing reprints and updates of the pornographic Tijuana Bibles from the 1930s.

In 1999, publisher Dowers retired the Starhead Comix name and created Brownfield Press to sell remaining titles and occasionally publish new projects.

In 2010, Fantagraphics Books published Newave!: The Underground Mini Comix of the 1980s, a nearly 900-page collection of minicomics (many of which originally saw print via Starhead), edited by Dowers. This was followed in 2013 by Dowers' Treasury of Mini Comics — Volume One, also published by Fantagraphics.

Titles (selected)

Minicomics 
 3R Cosmix (8 issues, 1984–1986) — Ronald Roach
Skinboy Fights Back (1984)  ---- J. R. Williams
 Armageddonquest (1984–1986) — Ronald Roach; followed by a full-size comics series in 1994
 Exquisite Corpse Comix (1985–1990) — anthology
 Morty the Dog (2 issues, 1987) — Steve Willis
 Outside In (7 issues, 1984–1985) — numbering continued from self-published Steve Willis title
 Seattle Star (1985–1990) — newsprint tabloid-size
 Starhead Presents (3 issues, 1987) — anthology

Comics 
 Amazing Adventures of Ace International (1 issue, 1993) — Dennis Eichhorn
 Armageddonquest (3 issues, 1994) — Ronald Roach
 Artistic Licentiousness (3 issues, 1991–1994) — Roberta Gregory
 Bezango Obscuro (1 issue, 1994) — Steve Willis
 Big Black Thing (1 issue, 1994) — Colin Upton 
 Big Mouth (2 issues, 1992–1993) — Pat Moriarity
 Bumber Comix (2 issues, 1985–1988)  — second issue published with a grant from the Bumbershoot Arts Festival
 Cruel and Unusual Punishment (2 issues, 1993–1994)
 Fun House (1 issue, 1993) — J. R. Williams
 Hemp for Victory (1 issue, 1995)
 The Mutant Book of the Dead (1 issue, 1994) — Mack White
 Northwest Cartoon Cookery (1 issue, 1995) - edited by Dennis Eichhorn
 Rat Fink Comix (1 issue, 1987) — Ed "Big Daddy" Roth
 Real Schmuck (1 issue, 1993) — Dennis Eichhorn
 Seattle Sketchbook (1 issue, 1995) — David Collier
 Stickboy (2 issues, 1993–1995)— Dennis Worden; numbering continues from Fantagraphics Books/Revolutionary Comics title
 The Tijuana Bible (9 issues, 1994–1998) — reprints of stories from the 1930s
 Tomato (2 issues, 1994–1995) — Ellen Forney

References

Notes

Sources consulted 
 
 
 Chrislip, Bruce. "Starhead Comics: Art for Art's Sake," Subliminal Tattoos #4 (Spring 1995), pp. 25-28.

External links 
 Brownfield Press website
 Brownfield Press website on Tripod
 R. K. Sloane's Curse of the Baby Monster, from Starhead Presents #2
 Starhead Comix at Open Library

Defunct comics and manga publishing companies
Comic book publishing companies of the United States
1984 establishments in Washington (state)
Publishing companies established in 1984
Minicomics
Companies based in Seattle